Barry John King (3 April 1945 – 27 March 2021) was a British Olympic decathlete who was later an author, corporate director, corporate board member and specialist in Olympic marketing and sports development.

Biography
He was founder and chief executive officer of Outdoor-Fitness, LLC., co-founder of Sports Directions Corporation, and served as a director at the United States Olympic Committee for 14 years during the height of their organizational and fundraising successes.

King is co-author of a two-book series, published in association with the United States Olympic Committee, entitled The Olympic Challenge as well as Journey of the Olympic Flame. King assisted in creating an Olympic themed Iowa state school educational curriculum for K-12 students, again, in conjunction with the United States Olympic Committee. In film, he was the technical director of the Walt Disney motion picture, The World's Greatest Athlete.

Athletics career
He grew up in England and obtained a track and field scholarship from the University of Colorado at Boulder in the United States. His first major international competition came when he represented England at the 1970 British Commonwealth Games, where he won the bronze medal in the decathlon.

He then took part in the 1972 Summer Olympics in Munich two years later, competing for Great Britain. He ranked fifteenth overall in the Olympic decathlon competition. He returned to the podium at the 1974 British Commonwealth Games in Christchurch, New Zealand, this time coming away with the silver medal.

He has held national records and won national championships in the decathlon, discus throw and pentathlon. He is the current British national pentathlon record holder, set on 20 May 1970 in Santa Barbara, California.

Personal life 
King was married to Deanna Pinckney-King and has one daughter.

References

External links

1945 births
2021 deaths
British decathletes
English decathletes
British male athletes
British writers
University of California, San Diego faculty
Olympic athletes of Great Britain
Athletes (track and field) at the 1972 Summer Olympics
Athletes (track and field) at the 1970 British Commonwealth Games
Athletes (track and field) at the 1974 British Commonwealth Games
Commonwealth Games silver medallists for England
Commonwealth Games bronze medallists for England
Commonwealth Games medallists in athletics
Medallists at the 1970 British Commonwealth Games
Medallists at the 1974 British Commonwealth Games